Re-boot is the first studio album by South Korean boy band Golden Child. It was released on November 18, 2019 through Woollim Entertainment and distributed by Kakao M. It contains twelve songs, including its lead single "Wannabe".

A repackage titled Without You was released on January 29, 2020 with the addition of two new songs, including the lead single of the same name.

Background and release 
On October 31, 2019, Woollim Entertainment revealed a new logo for Golden Child in a short video, featuring the team name written with a strong gold color with an addition of the mysterious word "Re-boot". Later, on November 4, the mysterious word was confirmed to be the name for their first full-length album when Woollim released the first set of individual concept photos. On November 5, they revealed the tracklist for the album, revealing "Wannabe" as the lead single. They also released the track preview for the track "Re-boot" and the lead single "Wannabe". Then, from November 8-11, they would release the track preview for "Lately", "Compass", "No Matter What", and "A Song For Me" consecutively. On November 11, they also released the second set of individual concept photos. On November 12-13, they released the track preview for "Spring Again" and "She's My Girl". On November 13, the first music video teaser for "Wannabe" was also released. On November 14, they released the track preview for "Our Heaven". On November 15, apart from releasing the track preview for "Fantasia", they also released the second music video teaser for "Wannabe". After releasing the track preview for "Don't Run Away" and "Go Together" on November 16-17 consecutively,
they officially released Re-boot and the music video for "Wannabe" on November 18.

Track listing

Charts

Re-boot

Weekly charts

Monthly charts

Without You

Weekly charts

Monthly chart

Accolades

Music program awards

References 

2019 albums
Golden Child (band) albums
Korean-language albums